The 2012–13 Texas Strikers season was the first season of the Texas Strikers professional indoor soccer club. The Strikers, a Central Division team in the Professional Arena Soccer League, played their home games in Ford Arena in Beaumont, Texas. The team was led by owner James Germany and head coach Chris "Topper" Cogan. The Strikers are Beaumont's first professional soccer team.

Season summary

The team struggled early in the regular season but split its last six games, amassing a 3–13 record. The Strikers placed fifth in the five-team Central Division and failed to advance to the postseason. The franchise fared better at the box office, placing seventh in the 19-team league for average home attendance.

The Strikers did not participate in the 2012–13 United States Open Cup for Arena Soccer.

Off-field moves
The team's December 1, 2012, home opener against the Dallas Sidekicks was delayed by nearly two hours as the goals had not been properly installed by gametime. Blaming late shipping from the supplier for the delay, the team gave free popcorn and soft drinks to fans while they waited. The team later announced that anyone with a ticket stub from the delayed game could redeem it for free admission to the December 8 game against the Arizona Storm.

Roster moves
In early October 2012, the Strikers held two rounds of tryouts for prospective players at the Cris Quinn Soccer Complex in Beaumont. 63 prospects participated in the tryouts as the team worked to fill out a 20-man roster for the 2012–13 season.

On October 30, the team signed Thomas Shenton from Doncaster, England, Mikey Olabarrieta from Honduras, and Texas native Jeff LeBlanc.

The team roster for the regular season finale against the Dallas Sidekicks was partially filled out with players from Vitesse Dallas of the Premier Arena Soccer League.

Schedule

Regular season

♥ Replacement squad after Phoenix franchise revoked by league.

References

External links
Texas Strikers official website

Oxford City FC of Texas seasons
Texas Strikers
Texas Strikers 2012